Stanley Saunders, D.M.A., (born 3 May 1927) is a Welsh educator, clarinetist, violinist, and conductor. Born in Newport, Monmouthshire, he is a founding member of the first youth orchestra: the National Youth Orchestra of Wales.

Saunders is a recipient of the Queen Elizabeth II Silver Jubilee Medal.

Career 
Saunders was the conductor of many orchestras, including: the Franco-Gallois Orchestra, the University of Guelph Civic Orchestra, and the Brantford Symphony Orchestra, as well as being the first principal conductor of the New Brunswick Youth Orchestra.

External links
 Stanley Saunders at The Canadian Encyclopedia
 University of Guelph alumni page on Maestro Stanley Saunders

1927 births
Alumni of the University of Wales
Canadian clarinetists
Canadian conductors (music)
Male conductors (music)
Possibly living people
People associated with Cardiff Metropolitan University
People from Newport, Wales
Academic staff of the University of Guelph
University of Oregon alumni
Welsh clarinetists
Welsh conductors (music)
British male conductors (music)
Welsh educators
Welsh violinists
British male violinists
21st-century British conductors (music)
21st-century clarinetists
21st-century violinists
21st-century British male musicians